Dimitrios Sialmas (born 19 June 1986) is a Greek professional footballer who plays as a forward for Apollonas Efpaliou.

Club career

Panionios
In August 2006, Sialmas signed a two-year deal with Panionios from Ethnikos Asteras. However, he didn't impress with his appearances as he scored 6 goals throughout two years.

Ethnikos Piraeus, PAS Giannina and Olympiakos Volos
In July 2008, Sialmas signed a two-year deal with Ethnikos Piraeus, which lasted for only one. Afterwards, Giannina approached him and signed him, as PAS considered him to be a talented striker. Giannina fans loved him, something that intrigued the Volos club and that led Olympiacos Volos to sign him on loan for 6 months.

AEK Athens
On 30 May 2011 Sialmas signed a three-year deal with AEK Athens on a free transfer keeping him at the club until 2014. Sialmas also chose the number 11 Jersey previously worn by former AEK player Demis Nikolaidis. His skills and movements reminded ΑΕΚ fans of Nikolaidis and many of them compared the two. Sialmas scored two goals against Levadiakos and helped AEK to win 0–2. He was also given the MVP award.

Khazar Lankaran
In the summer of 2012 Sialmas signed for Azerbaijan Premier League side Khazar Lankaran on a one-year contract. Sialmas scored six goals in 24 games in all competitions for Khazar, as well as reaching the 2012–13 Azerbaijan Cup final. In the final the game went to penalties after finishing 0-0 after extra time, Sialmas took and missed the opening Khazar penalty, resulting in Neftchi Baku winning 5-3 on penalties. Sialmas was released at the end of his contract in the summer of 2013.

Platanias
On 12 December 2013 Sialmas signed for Super League Greece side Platanias on a -year contract.

Ceahlăul Piatra Neamţ
In January 2015, Sialmas decided to stay abroad, although he had offers from Greek Super League clubs to be repatriated. The Greek striker will continue his career in Ceahlăul Piatra Neamţ for the next six months, which struggling for remaining in the first division of the Romanian championship.

Akropolis
In March 2016, Sialmas moved to Swedish side Akropolis IF.

Panachaiki
In August 2016, Sialmas agreed with Panachaiki, a club playing in Greek 3rd Division.

Trikala
On 30 August 2017, he moved to Football League side Trikala. On 21 September 2017, he made his debut and scored his first goal, with a beautiful bicycle kick, in a 3–1 away win against Sparti for the Greek Cup. However, before the final whistle he was injured and one day later the medical diagnosis confirmed that he had suffered a cruciate rupture. He is expected to return in five months. On 13 May 2018, in the second game following his recovery from his injury, he came in as a substitute and scored with a stunning bicycle kick in a 1–0 home win against Aiginiakos. One week later he scored with an amazing 30-yard shot in a 1–0 away win against Kallithea.

Irodotos
On 29 December 2018, following his release from Trikala, he joined Irodotos on a free-transfer. On 10 February 2019, he scored his first goal for the club with an impressive bicycle kick equalizing the score in an eventual 1–1 home draw against Iraklis. One week later, he equalized in a 1–1 away draw against Aittitos Spata, securing a precious point for his team in the battle to avoid promotion.

Australia and later career
On 20 June 2019 Gladesville Ryde Magic confirmed, that they had signed Sialmas. However, he was presented as a new Nafplio 2017 player in Greece on 16 September 2019. One month later, he joined Asteras Vlachioti.

References

External links
 
Myplayer.gr Profile
Onsports.gr Profile
Profile at epae.org

1986 births
Living people
Panionios F.C. players
Ethnikos Piraeus F.C. players
PAS Giannina F.C. players
Olympiacos Volos F.C. players
AEK Athens F.C. players
Khazar Lankaran FK players
CSM Ceahlăul Piatra Neamț players
Super League Greece players
Liga I players
Greek expatriate footballers
Expatriate footballers in Romania
Trikala F.C. players
Association football forwards
Footballers from Athens
Greek footballers